{{DISPLAYTITLE:C18H19N3O2}}
The molecular formula C18H19N3O2 (molar mass: 309.36 g/mol, exact mass: 309.1477 u) may refer to:

 CGS-20625
 Irampanel
 Nerisopam

Molecular formulas